Phoenix or Phoinix was a town of ancient Caria, near the mountain of the same name on the southern branch of the Bozburun Peninsula. It may be the same as the town called Phoenice or Phoinike (Φοινίκη) by Stephanus of Byzantium.

It belonged to the Rhodian Peraea.

Its site is located near Fenaket in Asiatic Turkey. Archaeology has uncovered numerous inscriptions.

References

Populated places in ancient Caria
Former populated places in Turkey
History of Muğla Province
Marmaris District
Ancient Greek archaeological sites in Turkey
Ancient Rhodes
Greek colonies in Caria